Francisco Javier Rodríguez Vidales (born 14 September 1965) is a Spanish football coach.

Football career
Born in Astorga, Province of León, Vidales was in the youth ranks of Sporting de Gijón but never played senior football. He became manager of their reserve team in 1997 and the following year was assistant in the first team to Antonio López Habas.

Vidales spent most of his career with teams in Segunda División B. In October 2005, he was dismissed by UD Vecindario, who finished the season with promotion under his successor Pacuco Rosales.

Remaining in the Canary Islands, Vidales replaced Juan Manuel Rodríguez as manager of UD Las Palmas on 3 December 2008. Three days later on his professional debut in Segunda División, the team won 2–0 at home to RC Celta de Vigo. He finished the season in 16th, seven points above relegation, and was himself replaced by Paco Castellano.

On 5 January 2010, Vidales returned to Sporting's reserves. He left in May 2011, after their relegation to Tercera División; the team however avoided the drop by buying the place vacated by the withdrawal of Cultural y Deportiva Leonesa.

References

External links
 

1969 births
Living people
People from Astorga, Spain
Sportspeople from the Province of León
Spanish football managers
CD Lugo managers
UD Vecindario managers
UD Las Palmas managers
Segunda División managers